
Gmina Spiczyn is a rural gmina (administrative district) in Łęczna County, Lublin Voivodeship, in eastern Poland.

Villages
Gmina Spiczyn contains the villages and settlements of Charlęż, Januszówka, Jawidz, Kijany, Nowa Wólka, Nowy Radzic, Spiczyn, Stawek, Zawieprzyce, Zawieprzyce-Kolonia and Ziółków.

Neighbouring gminas
Gmina Spiczyn is bordered by the gminas of Łęczna, Lubartów, Ludwin, Niemce, Ostrów Lubelski, Serniki and Wólka.

References

 Polish official population figures 2006

Spiczyn
Łęczna County